Henryka Sadowska is a Polish cross-country skier. She represented Poland at the 1984 Winter Paralympics and she won the gold medal in the women's 3x5 km relay LW2-9 event.

She also competed in the women's short distance 5 km LW4 and women's middle distance 10 km LW4 events.

References

External links 
 

Living people
Year of birth missing (living people)
Place of birth missing (living people)
Paralympic cross-country skiers of Poland
Cross-country skiers at the 1984 Winter Paralympics
Medalists at the 1984 Winter Paralympics
Paralympic gold medalists for Poland
Paralympic medalists in cross-country skiing
Polish female cross-country skiers